Taddeus Nkeng Fomakwang (born 26 February 2000) is a Cameroonian footballer who plays as a forward.

Career statistics

Club

Notes

References

2000 births
Living people
Cameroonian footballers
Cameroonian expatriate footballers
Association football forwards
Liga Portugal 2 players
Ukrainian Premier League players
Veikkausliiga players
FC Porto players
FC Porto B players
FC Olimpik Donetsk players
Helsingin Jalkapalloklubi players
Expatriate footballers in Portugal
Cameroonian expatriate sportspeople in Portugal
Expatriate footballers in Ukraine
Cameroonian expatriate sportspeople in Ukraine
Expatriate footballers in Finland
Cameroonian expatriate sportspeople in Finland